Tomás Berreta Gandolfo (November 22, 1875 – August 2, 1947) was the President of Uruguay for five months in 1947.

Background

Having been an activist in the Uruguayan Colorado Party since 1896, for a number of years he was active in local politics and served as Intendent of Canelones in the early part of the 20th century.

He served as the President of the Senate of Uruguay in 1943. He later served in the government of President Juan José de Amézaga.

Berreta was thus a prominent, elderly member of the Uruguayan Colorado Party which had ruled the country for long periods, when he stood for election as President, with a view to succeeding the sitting President of Uruguay, Juan José de Amézaga, who was younger than he by several years.

President of Uruguay

March 1947 inauguration

Berreta was inaugurated as President of Uruguay on 1 March 1947.

A longstanding military man by profession, President Berreta was notably responsible for founding the Liceo Militar General Artigas, Montevideo, a secondary school in the nation's capital to be run on military lines.

During his brief period of office President Berreta had opportunity to travel to meet US President Harry S. Truman in Washington, DC.

Death and succession

Berreta died in office barely five months later on 2 August 1947, victim of prostate cancer.

The Vice President of Uruguay during Berreta's short Presidency was Luis Batlle Berres. Subsequently, Battle Berres succeeded Berreta as President of Uruguay.

See also
 Politics of Uruguay
 (Photo) President Berretta (right, seated) and President Harry S. Truman (left, seated) at a meeting in 1947:

Notes

References
 :es:Tomás Berretta (Spanish Wikipedia)
 Tomás Berreta. Apología de la acción by Daniel Vidart (contains information on his political achievements)

1875 births
1947 deaths
People from Montevideo
Uruguayan people of Italian descent
Colorado Party (Uruguay) politicians
Presidents of Uruguay
Members of the National Council of Administration
Government ministers of Uruguay
Members of the Chamber of Representatives of Uruguay (1923–1926)
Members of the Chamber of Representatives of Uruguay (1926–1929)
Members of the Chamber of Representatives of Uruguay (1929–1932)
Presidents of the Senate of Uruguay
Members of the Senate of Uruguay (1943–1947)
Intendants of Canelones Department
Deaths from cancer in Uruguay
Deaths from prostate cancer